Capote is a 2005 biographical drama film about American novelist Truman Capote directed by Bennett Miller, and starring Philip Seymour Hoffman in the title role. The film primarily follows the events during the writing of Capote's 1965 nonfiction book In Cold Blood. The film was based on Gerald Clarke's 1988 biography Capote. It was released September 30, 2005, coinciding with Capote's birthday.

The film became a box office success and received acclaim from critics for Hoffman's lead performance. It eventually won several awards, and was nominated for 5 Academy Awards including Best Picture, Best Director for Miller, Best Supporting Actress for Catherine Keener, and Best Adapted Screenplay, with Hoffman winning the Academy Award for Best Actor.

Plot
In 1959, the bodies of the Clutter family are discovered on their Kansas farm. While reading The New York Times, Truman Capote is riveted by the story and calls The New Yorker magazine editor William Shawn to tell him that he plans to document the tragedy.

Capote travels to Kansas, inviting childhood friend Nelle Harper Lee to come along. He intends to interview those involved with the Clutter family, with Lee as his go-between and facilitator. Alvin Dewey, the Kansas Bureau of Investigation's lead detective on the case, brushes him off. Still, Dewey's wife Marie is a fan of Capote's writing and persuades her husband to invite Capote and Lee to their house for dinner.

Capote's stories of movie sets and film stars captivate Marie. Over time, her husband warms to Capote and allows him to view the photographs of the victims. The Deweys, Lee, and Capote are having dinner when the murder suspects, Perry Smith and Richard "Dick" Hickock, are caught. Flattery, bribery, and a keen insight into the human condition facilitate Capote's visits to the prison where the accused are held.

Capote begins to form an attachment to Smith. He informs Shawn of his intent to expand the story into a full-length book. Following the trial and conviction, after which both Smith and Hickock are sentenced to death, Capote gains continued access to the murderers by bribing Warden Marshall Krutch.

Capote spends the following years regularly visiting Smith and learning about his life, excepting a year-long stint when he goes to Morocco and Spain to write the "first three parts" of the book, accompanied by his romantic partner Jack Dunphy.

The story of Smith's life, his remorseful manner, and his emotional sincerity impress Capote, who becomes emotionally attached to him despite the gruesome murders. Capote aids Smith and Hickock by obtaining expert legal counsel for them and initiating an appeal. Still, he is frustrated, as Smith declines to relate exactly what happened the night of the murders.

Though initially an effort to provide proper representation and extend Capote's opportunity to speak with the killers, the appeals process drags on for several years. Without the court case being resolved, Capote feels he is stuck with a story without an ending, and he is unable to complete his book. Eventually, he gets Smith to describe the killings and his thoughts at the time in great detail. He has what he wants from Smith, but he sees a callousness and selfishness in his own actions in the process.

Now with everything in hand, Capote still must wait for the appeals process to conclude before he feels he can publish his work. Over time, Lee's best-selling novel To Kill a Mockingbird is turned into a movie, but Capote is unable to share in the joy of his friend's success, too caught up in drinking through his own misery.

With the last appeal rejected, Smith pleads for Capote to return before he is executed, but Capote cannot bring himself to do so. A telegram from Smith to Harper Lee ultimately compels Capote to return to Kansas. There he is an eyewitness as Smith and Hickock are executed.

Capote talks to Lee about the horrifying experience and laments that he could not do anything to stop it. She replies, "Maybe not. The fact is you didn't want to." While returning home, Capote looks through photos from the case and at the writings and drawings given to him by Smith.

An epilogue points out that In Cold Blood turned Capote into the most famous writer in America, also noting that he never finished another book. A postscript gives the epigraph he would have chosen for the title of Answered Prayers: "More tears are shed over answered prayers than unanswered ones", a quote from Saint Teresa of Ávila.

Cast

Reception

Box office
Capote grossed $28.8 million in the United States and Canada and $21.2 million in other territories for a worldwide total of $50 million. DVD/Blu-ray sales totaled $17 million by 2018. The production budget was $7 million.

Critical response
Capote received wide acclaim from critics, with Hoffman's performance the subject of particular praise. Review aggregator Rotten Tomatoes reported that 89% of critics gave the film a positive review, with an average rating of 8.20/10 based on 197 reviews. The site's consensus reads: "Philip Seymour Hoffman's riveting central performance guides a well-constructed retelling of the most sensational and significant period in author Truman Capote's life." On Metacritic, the film has a score of 88 out of 100 based on 40 critics, indicating "universal acclaim". Roger Ebert gave the film a four-star rating, stating: "Capote is a film of uncommon strength and insight, about a man whose great achievement requires the surrender of his self-respect."

Accolades

Capote won several awards, including the National Society of Film Critics Award for Best Film, and was named one of the top ten films of the year by both the American Film Institute and the National Board of Review. It was nominated for five Academy Awards and five British Academy Film Awards, including for best film, best director (for Miller), best supporting actress (for Catherine Keener) and best adapted screenplay (for Futterman), with Hoffman winning the award for best actor at both ceremonies. In addition to the Academy Award and British Academy Film Award, Hoffman won the Golden Globe Award and Screen Actors Guild Award as well as awards from numerous critics groups for his performance. Furthermore, director Miller won the Gotham Independent Film Award for Breakthrough Director and received a nomination at the Directors Guild of America Awards, and Futterman's screenplay was nominated at the Writers Guild of America Awards.

Historical accuracy
To gain access to Smith and Hickock while they were on Death Row, Capote is shown bribing the warden. This incident is based on a quote from Clarke's biography but appears to be incorrect. According to fact checkers, Warden Sherman Crouse initially denied Capote access due to prison regulations which restricted contact with prisoners to immediate family and legal counsel. Capote then retained the firm of Saffels & Hope, who approached the governor of the state and worked out a deal.

No non-fiction sources (including Clarke's) assert that Capote attempted to secure legal representation for Smith and Hickock as is shown in the film. The initial appeal was handled by public defenders and subsequent appeals by the Kansas Legal Aid Society after they were contacted by Hickock. This is mentioned in Capote's book and there is no evidence he ever offered to help find a lawyer.

Capote mainly corresponded with Hickock and Smith through letters, visiting them in person less than half a dozen times. Extended stays at the prison are fictionalized, although some confrontations are based on real letters.

Home media
Capote was released on VHS (as a public screener only) and DVD on March 14, 2006. It got American Blu-ray releases on February 17, 2009, October 8, 2012, and January 6, 2015.

See also 

 Clutter family murders
 In Cold Blood (1966), Truman Capote's non-fiction novel 
 In Cold Blood (1967), a film based on Capote's eponymous book 
 Infamous (2006), a film on a similar theme
 Lowell Lee Andrews

References

External links
 
 
 

2000s crime drama films
2005 films
American biographical films
American crime drama films
American LGBT-related films
BAFTA winners (films)
Biographical films about writers
Canadian crime drama films
Canadian LGBT-related films
English-language Canadian films
Films about capital punishment
Films directed by Bennett Miller
Films scored by Mychael Danna
Films featuring a Best Actor Academy Award-winning performance
Films featuring a Best Drama Actor Golden Globe winning performance
Films set in Kansas
Films set in the 1950s
Films set in the 1960s
Films shot in Winnipeg
Gay-related films
Sony Pictures Classics films
United Artists films
2005 independent films
Cultural depictions of Truman Capote
2005 drama films
National Society of Film Critics Award for Best Film winners
2000s English-language films
2000s American films
2000s Canadian films